Simon Kaiser (24 October 1828, in Biberist – 27 March 1898) was a Swiss politician and President of the Swiss National Council twice (1868/1869 and 1883/1884).

External links 
 
 

1828 births
1898 deaths
People from the canton of Solothurn
Swiss Old Catholics
Free Democratic Party of Switzerland politicians
Members of the National Council (Switzerland)
Presidents of the National Council (Switzerland)